Road was an American hard rock band that formed in Los Angeles, California in 1970. Comprising bassist/vocalist Noel Redding (previously of The Jimi Hendrix Experience and Fat Mattress), guitarist/vocalist Rod Richards (formerly of Rare Earth) and drummer/vocalist Leslie Sampson, the band released one album, Road, in 1972.

History
Road was formed in 1970, after Redding left Fat Mattress and Richards left Rare Earth. The band recorded their self-titled album at the Record Plant Studios in Los Angeles, California in 1972, the album was released later in the year before the group disbanded. In the brief time they were together, Redding and Sampson participated in the jam sessions that resulted in Randy California's 1972 Kapt. Kopter and the (Fabulous) Twirly Birds album. Following Road, Redding and Sampson formed The Noel Redding Band, while Richards went on to a solo career. Sampson also joined Stray Dog, played in The Gas in the early 80s and Sally Barker And The Rhythm and The Pirates in the 90s.

Band members
Noel Redding – bass, vocals
Rod Richards – guitar, vocals
Leslie Sampson – drums, vocals

Discography
Road (1972)

References

Hard rock musical groups from California
Psychedelic rock music groups from California
Musical groups established in 1970
Musical groups disestablished in 1972
1970 establishments in California
1972 disestablishments in California